Markowski (feminine: Markowska, plural: Markowscy) is a Polish surname. It may refer to:
 Alfreda Markowska (born 1926), Polish Porajmos survivor
 Andrzej Markowski (1924–1986), Polish composer
 Krzysztof Markowski (born 1979), Polish footballer
 Liesel Markowski (1928–2019), German musicologist
 Paul Markowski, American meteorologist and tornado expert
 Paul Markowski (politician) (1929–1978), East German politician
 Tomasz Markowski (disambiguation)
 Vincent Markowski (1903–1954), birth name of American actor known professionally as Tom Tyler

See Also 

 Markoski
 Markovski

Polish-language surnames
Patronymic surnames